A goof is a term for a mistake, often used in cinema.

Goof may also refer to:

 Goofing off, the act of wasting work time
 Goofy, a Disney cartoon character (nicknamed or sometimes surnamed "Goof")
 Max Goof, son of the character Goofy
 Goof Bowyer (1903–1988), college football player and coach
 The Goof (officially the Garden Gate), a restaurant in the Beaches neighborhood of Toronto

See also
 Goof off (disambiguation)
 Goofy (disambiguation)
 Goofball (disambiguation)
 Goof Abaaley, a town in the southern Bay region of Somalia